The Carolina Northern Railroad was a shortline railroad that served eastern South Carolina and eastern North Carolina in the early 20th century.

The Carolina Northern was chartered to extend from Lumberton, North Carolina, to South Marion, South Carolina, a distance of about 40 miles. Construction began in 1899 and the line first opened on January 1, 1900, with completion coming on December 1, 1901. 

The carrier entered receivership a year later, on December 2, 1902, after which it was acquired by the Raleigh and Charleston Railroad.

The Raleigh and Charleston Railroad Company was incorporated in 1905. In December 1911, the Seaboard Air Line Railroad acquired the company. The stretch between Lumberton and Lake View, South Carolina, was abandoned in 1933, while the remaining section from Lake View to Marion was abandoned in 1941.

References

Defunct North Carolina railroads
Defunct South Carolina railroads
Railway companies established in 1900
Railway companies disestablished in 1905